The 1998 IAAF Grand Prix was the fourteenth edition of the annual global series of one-day track and field competitions organized by the International Association of Athletics Federations (IAAF). The series changed format that year to incorporate the six 1998 IAAF Golden League meetings as the top tier, followed by the existing Grand Prix I and Grand Prix II level meetings, then finally the Permit level meetings. Grand Prix I featured nine meetings from 3 May to 25 August and Grand Prix II featured 11 meetings from 25 February to 30 August, making a combined total of 26 meetings for the series. An additional 11 IAAF Outdoor Permit Meetings were attached to the circuit. Permit Meetings originally scheduled for Jakarta and San Jose, California were later dropped.

Performances on designated events on the circuit earned athletes points which qualified them for entry to the 1998 IAAF Grand Prix Final, held on 5 September in Moscow, Russia. A further four IAAF Permit Meetings of non-Grand Prix status included point-scoring events in order to allow athletes full opportunities to compete in certain events. Middle-distance runner Hicham El Guerrouj was the points leader for the series, taking 96 points from eight meetings. The highest scoring female athlete was Marion Jones on 88 points over eight meetings – a feat also achieved by men's runner-up Bryan Bronson.

Meetings

Key:

Points standings

Overall men

Overall women

References

Points standings
1998 GRAND PRIX STANDINGS - Before Final OVERALL STANDING - Men. IAAF. Retrieved 2019-08-27.
1998 GRAND PRIX STANDINGS - Before Final OVERALL STANDING - Women. IAAF. Retrieved 2019-08-27. 

1998
IAAF Grand Prix